In law, an alien is any person (including an organization) who is not a citizen or a national of a specific country, although definitions and terminology differ to some degree depending upon the continent or region. More generally, however, the term "alien" is perceived as synonymous with foreign national.

Lexicology
The term "alien" is derived from the Latin , which in turn is derived from the Oscan , (a proto-Etruscan tribe), meaning a slave. The Latin later came to mean a stranger, a foreigner, or someone not related by blood. Similar terms to "alien" in this context include foreigner and lander.

Categories

Different countries around the world use varying terms for aliens. The following are several types of aliens:
 legal alien  any foreign national who is permitted under the law to be in the host country. This is a very broad category which includes travel visa holders or foreign tourists, registered refugees, temporary residents, permanent residents, and those who have relinquished their citizenship and/or nationality. Categories of legal alien include
 temporary resident alien  any foreign national who has been lawfully granted permission by the government to drive, fly, travel, lodge, reside, study or work for a specific number of years and then apply for an extension or leave the country before such permission expires.
 permanent resident alien  any immigrant who has been lawfully admitted into a nation and granted the legal right to remain therein as a permanent resident in accord with the nation's immigration laws.
 nonresident alien  any foreign national who is lawfully within a nation but whose legal domicile is in another nation.
 alien enemy (or enemy alien)  any foreign national of any country that is at war with the host country.
 undocumented alien (or illegal alien)  any person who is liable to deportation because their presence in a nation is in violation of that nation's immigration laws.

Common law jurisdictions

An "alien" in English law denoted any person born outside of the monarch's dominions and who did not owe allegiance to the monarch. Aliens were not allowed to own land and were subject to different taxes to subjects. This idea was passed on in the Commonwealth to other common law jurisdictions.

Australia
In Australia, citizenship is defined in the Australian nationality law. Non-citizens in Australia are permanent residents, temporary residents, or illegal residents (technically called "unlawful non-citizens"). Most non-citizens (including those who lack citizenship documents) traveling to Australia must obtain a visa prior to travel. The only exceptions to the rule are holders of New Zealand passports and citizenship, who may apply for a visa on arrival according to the Trans-Tasman Travel Arrangement.

In 2020, in Love v Commonwealth, the High Court of Australia ruled that Aboriginal Australians (as defined in Mabo v Queensland (No 2)) cannot be considered aliens under the Constitution of Australia, regardless of whether they were born in Australia or hold Australian citizenship.

Canada
In Canada, the term "alien" is not used in federal statutes. Instead, the term "foreign national" serves as its equivalent and is found in legal documents. The Immigration and Refugee Protection Act defines "foreign national" as "a person who is not a Canadian citizen or a permanent resident, and includes a stateless person."

United Kingdom

In the United Kingdom, the British Nationality Act of 1981 defines an alien as a person who is not a British citizen, a citizen of Ireland, a Commonwealth citizen, or a British protected person. The Aliens Act of 1905, the British Nationality and Status of Aliens Act of 1914 and the Aliens Restriction (Amendment) Act of 1919 were all products of the turbulence in the early part of the 20th century.

United States

Under the Immigration and Nationality Act (INA) of the United States, "[t]he term 'alien' means any person not a citizen or national of the United States." People born in American Samoa or on Swains Island are statutorily "non-citizen nationals." Others, such as natives of Palau and the Marshall Islands, are legal immigrants and aliens for INA purposes.

Every refugee that is admitted to the United States under  automatically becomes an "immigrant" and then a "special immigrant" after receiving a green card.

The usage of the term "alien" dates back to 1798, when it was used in the Alien and Sedition Acts. Although the INA provides no overarching explicit definition of the term "illegal alien", it is mentioned in a number of provisions under title 8 of the US code. Several provisions even mention the term "unauthorized alien". According to PolitiFact, the term "illegal alien" occurs in federal law, but does so scarcely. PolitiFact opines that, "where the term does appear, it's undefined or part of an introductory title or limited to apply to certain individuals convicted of felonies."

Since the U.S. law says that a corporation is a person, the term alien is not limited to natural humans because what are colloquially called foreign corporations are technically called alien corporations. Because corporations are creations of local state law, a foreign corporation is an out-of-state corporation.

There are a multitude of unique and highly complex U.S. domestic tax laws and regulations affecting the U.S. tax residency of foreign nationals, both nonresident aliens and resident aliens, in addition to income tax and social security tax treaties and totalization agreements.

"Alienage," i.e., citizenship status, has been prohibited since 1989 in New York City from being considered for employment, under that town's Human Rights legislation.

Other jurisdictions

Arab states 

In the Gulf Cooperation Council (United Arab Emirates, Saudi Arabia, Kuwait, Oman, Bahrain, and Qatar), many non-natives have lived in the region since birth. However, these Arab states do not easily grant citizenship to non-natives. Most stateless Bedoon in Kuwait belong to indigenous northern tribes.

Latvia 

On Latvian passports, the mark  (alien) refers to non-citizens or former citizens of the Soviet Union (USSR) who do not have voting rights for the parliament of Latvia but have rights and privileges under Latvian law and international bilateral treaties, such as the right to travel without visas to both the European Union and Russia, where latter is not possible for Latvian citizens.

See also 
 Alien land laws
 Alien Tort Statute
 California Alien Land Law of 1913
 Gaijin
 Laowai
 Persona non grata
 Unaccompanied Alien Children

Notes and references
This article in most part is based on the law of the United States, including statutory and latest published case law.

External links

Convention against Torture and Other Cruel, Inhuman or Degrading Treatment or Punishment
Biden seeks to replace 'alien' with less 'dehumanizing term' in immigration laws (NBC News, Jan. 22, 2021)
Aliens - International Law - Oxford Bibliographies (24 July 2013)
The rights of non-citizens, Office of the United Nations High Commissioner for Human Rights, 2006
Council of Europe Commission for Democracy through Law report on noncitizens and minority rights, 2007
D. C. Earnest Noncitizen Voting Rights: A Survey of an Emerging Democratic Norm, 2003
University of Minnesota Human Rights Center: Study Guide: The Rights of Non-Citizens, 2003
UK Aliens' registration cards on The National Archives' website.

American legal terminology
Expatriates
Human migration
Immigration law
Nationality
People by legal status
Strangers
United States immigration law